Czarnota is a Polish surname derived from the color black. Notable people with the surname include:
 Joseph Czarnota (1925–1968), American Olympic ice hockey player
 Paweł Czarnota (born 1988), Polish chess grandmaster
 Laura Czarnotta (born 1990), Polish figure skater
 Wacław Bojarski (1921–1943) Polish poet and magazine editor, known by the pseudonym Czarnota

See also
 

Polish-language surnames